La Nef (French: The Nave (of a ship or church or a medieval boat) is a French-Canadian early music performance group founded in Quebec in 1991. The founding members were Sylvain Bergeron, the guitar and musical director; and Claire Gignac, the contralto, recorder, theatrical director; and Viviane LeBlanc, soprano.

Their first show was Musiques pour Jeanne la Folle ("Music for Joan the Mad"), later recorded as a CD for Dorian Recordings.

Discography
 Music for Joan the Mad (Dorian)
 Perceval - La quête du Graal vol.1 La Nef Daniel Taylor (Dorian)
 Perceval - The Quest For The Grail Vol.2 La Nef (Dorian)		
 Garden of Earthly Delights (Dorian)
 Montségur: La Tragedie Cathare (Dorian)
 Musiques des Montagnes - Music of Greece. Claire Gignac (Atma)
 Oikan Ayns Bethlehem - Celtic Christmas songs. Meredith Hall (Atma)
 La traverse miraculeuse Les Charbonniers de l'enfer & La Nef (Atma)
 The Battle of Killiecrankie. Matthew White (Atma)
 Dowland in Dublin - with Michael Slattery, tenor. (Atma)
 Trobairitz - Poems of Women Troubadours - with Shannon Mercer, music by Seán Dagher. (Analekta)

References

Early music groups
Musical groups established in 1991
Musical groups from Quebec
Canadian folk music groups
Canadian Celtic music groups
1991 establishments in Quebec